Gene Carr may refer to:

 Gene Carr (cartoonist) (1881–1959), comic strip artist
 Gene Carr (ice hockey) (born 1951), ice hockey player